Jalal Anatolii Harutyunyan (born 11 November 1974) is an Armenian general from the Republic of Artsakh who formerly served as Commander of the Artsakh Defense Army and Minister of Defense of Artsakh. He commanded the Artsakh Defense Army during the 2020 Nagorno-Karabakh War until his dismissal on 27 October 2020 after being wounded in action. He was appointed Head of the Military Control Service of the Ministry of Defense of Armenia in February 2021. Harutyunyan was suspended from this role in connection with a criminal case opened against him in September 2022.

Early life and education
Harutyunyan was born on 11 November 1974, in Badara, then a part of the Nagorno Karabakh Autonomous Oblast in the Azerbaijan SSR. His father, Anatoli Harutyunyan, was vice-principal and mathematics teacher at a local school, while his mother, Svetlana Arushanyan, worked as a nurse. From 1991 to 1995, he studied biology at Artsakh State University. In 1999, he entered the Mikhailovskaya Artillery Military Academy in Saint Petersburg under the Ministry of Defense of the Russia Federation, from which he graduated with honors.

Career
Harutyunyan has served in the Artsakh Defense Army since 5 November 1992, when he volunteered for service at the age of 17. He fought in the First Nagorno-Karabakh War from 1992 to 1994. He served in various positions in the Defense Army, primarily in artillery units such as the Assistant to the Head of Artillery Intelligence. He also served as artillery chief of one of Artsakh's military districts. From 2018 to 2020, he served as First Deputy Commander of the Artsakh Defense Army. On 24 February 2020, he was appointed Minister of Defense by President Bako Sahakyan and was reappointed by President Arayik Harutyunyan on 8 June. 

Harutyunyan made a call for battle during the 2020 Nagorno-Karabakh war against Azerbaijan. On 27 October 2020, the president of Artsakh announced that Harutyunyan was relieved of his position after being wounded in fighting, replacing him with Mikael Arzumanyan.  A video showing a UAV strike on a car that allegedly belonged to Harutyunyan began circulating online. However, the spokesperson of the president of Artsakh denied the footage had anything to do with Harutyunyan's injuries. On October 28 2020, the president of Artsakh announced his decision to grant Jalal Harutyunyan the title Hero of Artsakh. He was discharged from hospital in early December 2020.

In January 2021, the Prosecutor General's Office of Armenia announced that a criminal case had been opened already in October 2020 on the attempt on Harutyunyan's life made during the war, and stated that no one had been charged in connection with the case yet. In February 2021, by the order of Vagharshak Harutyunyan, Defense Minister of Armenia, Harutyunyan was appointed to the post of the Head of the Military Control Service of the Ministry of Defense of Armenia.

On 2 September 2022, the Investigative Committee of Armenia announced that a criminal case had been opened against Jalal Harutyunyan on two counts of “careless attitude towards military service” during the 2020 Nagorno-Karabakh war. If convicted, Harutyunyan could be sentenced to between four and eight years imprisonment.

Dates of rank

References

1974 births
Living people
Heroes of Artsakh
Defence ministers of the Republic of Artsakh
Artsakh military personnel
People from Khojaly District
Armenian military personnel of the Nagorno-Karabakh War
Armenian military personnel of the 2020 Nagorno-Karabakh war
Artsakh University alumni